William Clarence Laird (October 29, 1891 – February 16, 1953) was a Canadian professional ice hockey goaltender. He played with the Regina Capitals of the Western Canada Hockey League from 1921 to 1923.

References

External links

1891 births
1953 deaths
Ice hockey people from Ontario
People from Cobourg
Regina Capitals players
Canadian ice hockey goaltenders